The women's beach flags in lifesaving at the 2001 World Games took place on 26 August 2001 at the Iwaki Island Park in Iwaki, Japan.

Competition format
A total of 26 athletes entered the competition. The best five athletes from each heat advances to the final.

Results

Heats

Heat 1

|
Heat 2

Final

References

External links
 Results on IWGA website

Lifesaving at the 2001 World Games